Thomas Hearns vs. Roberto Durán, billed as Malice at the Palace, was a professional boxing match contested on June 15, 1984 for the WBC and The Ring super welterweight titles.

Background
Roberto Durán had captured the WBA super welterweight title after defeating the reigning champion Davey Moore on June 16, 1983. Durán's first defense of his newly won title was put on hold when it was announced two weeks after his victory that he would be moving up to the middleweight division to challenge Marvin Hagler for Hagler's undisputed middleweight crown. After losing a close unanimous decision to Hagler in November, Durán would opt to return to the super welterweight division. Durán was scheduled to make a mandatory defense against the WBA's number-one ranked contender Mike McCallum with promoter Dan Duva negotiating with both fighters in February 1984. However, in a press conference the following month, Durán announced that he would instead face WBC super welterweight titlist Thomas Hearns and that he would vacate his title if the WBA would not grant an extension that would allow him to make his mandatory defense after his fight with Hearns rather than before. After the WBA refused an extension, Durán announced in early May that he would indeed vacate the title and move forward with his fight against Hearns.

The bout was originally scheduled to take place in The Bahamas, but when the site proved incompatible due to both logistical and financial issues, it was instead moved to Caesars Palace on the Las Vegas Strip. Caesars Palace had become available when a heavyweight title bout between Larry Holmes and Gerrie Coetzee scheduled for June 8 was cancelled by the site due to breach of contract three weeks before it was to take place.

The fight
The fight was lopsided in Hearns' favor as he dominated Durán en route to a second-round knockout victory. Hearns had both a 5½-inch height advantage and 11-inch reach advantage which caused problems for Durán as he struggled to get inside on his larger opponent as Hearns kept him at bay with his left jab. With a minute left in the first round, Durán tried to attack Hearns with a body shot, but Hearns countered with a left hook that opened a cut above Durán's eye. 30 seconds later Hearns sent Durán down after catching him flush with a hard right hand. After getting back up and taking the referee's standing-eight count Durán was allowed to continue but Hearns swarmed Durán with a series of rights and lefts before knocking him down again with an uppercut to the body with only seconds remaining though Durán would again get back and answer the referee's eight-count as the round came to an end. After the bell rang, a dazed Durán wandered to a neutral corner causing one of his corner-men to grab him and lead him back to his own. In round two, Hearns would back Durán into the ropes and tee off with a series of combinations as Durán desperately tried to fight back. Then just as the first minute of the round came to an end, Hearns landed a devastating right to Durán's jaw that sent Durán down face-first on the canvas. The referee Carlos Padilla Jr. stopped the fight immediately, giving Hearns a technical knockout victory at 1:07 of the round.

Fight card

References

1984 in boxing
Boxing in Las Vegas
Boxing matches
Caesars Palace
June 1984 sports events in the United States